The Pennsylvania Railroad (PRR) class CC2s consisted of ten 0-8-8-0 compound articulated (Mallet) type of steam locomotive built by Baldwin Locomotive Works in 1919 for PRR. These were used for transfer runs, and used for switching as "yard hump" power.

By 1957, all steam locomotives of the PRR were retired when the PRR switched from steam to diesel. These large engines continued to pull heavy transfer runs throughout the 1940s the PRR sold them for scrap between October 1947 and April 1949.

References 

Steam locomotives of the United States
CC2s
Scrapped locomotives
Railway locomotives introduced in 1919
Standard gauge locomotives of the United States